The 2001 Scheldeprijs was the 88th edition of the Scheldeprijs cycle race and was held on 25 April 2001. The race was won by Endrio Leoni of the Alessio team.

General classification

References

2001
2001 in road cycling
2001 in Belgian sport